Small Innovative Missions for Planetary Exploration (SIMPLEx) is a planetary exploration program operated by NASA. The program funds small, low-cost spacecraft for stand-alone planetary exploration missions. These spacecraft are intended to launch as secondary payloads on other missions and are riskier than Discovery or New Frontiers missions.

The program selects missions from multiple proposals and gives them some money to begin development. After early development they are analyzed to see if they are cost-effective and scientifically valuable during Key Decision Point-C. If they pass Key Decision Point-C then they move into full development. The missions must weigh less than 180 kg. So far only the first two missions have launched, and the remaining missions have struggled to stay within budget and find missions to launch with, and have been removed from multiple launches.

Missions 
On August 8, 2015, the first two SIMPLEx missions were selected: Q-PACE and LunaH-Map. They were both CubeSats and each had a maximum budget of $5.6 million. Q-PACE launched on a Virgin Orbit LauncherOne as part of the ELaNa 20 mission. LunaH-Map is a 6U CubeSat that will map hydrogen on the Moon. The mission launched as a secondary payload on Artemis-1.

Three SIMPLEx-2 missions were selected in 2019. Janus was going to launch with Psyche and fly past multiple binary asteroid, but was removed from that mission due to the Psyche spacecraft being delayed. Lunar Trailblazer will launch with the IM-2 mission to study the Moon's geology and map its water. EscaPADE will send two small satellites to Mars to study its magnetosphere.

So far, only two missions in the SIMPLEx program have launched.

Q-PACE 

Q-PACE is a 3U CubeSat that would have studied the interactions of small particles in space in order to better understand early protoplanetary disks. The mission launched on January 17, 2021 on Virgin Orbit's LauncherOne as part of NASA's ELaNa program. Contact was never established with the CubeSat.

LunaH-Map 

LunaH-Map (Lunar Polar Hydrogen Mapper) is a 6U CubeSat that will map Hydrogen on the Moon using a neutron spectrometer. This mission launched as one of ten secondary payloads on Artemis 1. The mission was designed, built, and tested by Arizona State University. It would have take over a year for LunaH-Map to reach its science orbit. After that, its 60 day science mission would begin. However, after it launched, the spacecraft ran into problems with its propulsion system.

Janus 

Janus will send two small spacecraft to explore binary asteroids. The two spacecraft were scheduled to launch with Psyche on a Falcon Heavy rocket. The two identical spacecraft (Janus A and B) are being built by Lockheed Martin and are powered by solar panels and rechargeable batteries. The original launch date for Psyche was August 1, 2022, but when that date was pushed to September 20, and then to 2023, NASA had to replan the trajectories for the Janus spacecraft. The Psyche launch was then moved to October 2023, but this new launch date will not allow Janus to complete its mission, so Janus was removed from the Psyche launch plan.

Lunar Trailblazer 

Lunar Trailblazer will study water ice on the Moon and determine how it formed, how common it is, and where it is. The small spacecraft will be capable of looking inside permanently shadowed craters for water ice. The mission is managed by NASA's Jet Propulsion Laboratory. The spacecraft is scheduled to be completed in 2022 and will launch around the middle of 2023 as a secondary payload on IM-2, Intuitive Machines' second lunar landing. The original plan was to launch Lunar Trailblazer as a secondary payload alongside IMAP in 2025, but since the spacecraft would have been ready years before it was scheduled to launch, NASA found an earlier launch opportunity.

EscaPADE 

EscaPADE (Escape and Plasma Acceleration and Dynamics Explorers) will send two identical spacecraft to Mars. The spacecraft will be built by Rocket Lab and will be based on its Photon spacecraft bus. EscaPADE will study Mars' magnetosphere and how it has led to Mars' losing much of its atmosphere. The mission was originally going to launch with Janus and Psyche, but was removed from the Psyche launch manifest in 2020. On February 9, 2023, NASA announced that Blue Origin's New Glenn rocket would launch EscaPADE in late 2024. Eleven months after launch, EscaPADE will arrive at Mars. No other payloads were mentioned.

See also 

 Discovery Program
 Explorers program

References 

NASA programs